James Thomas Slater is a two-time Grammy-nominated singer/songwriter based in Nashville.  He has written several hit songs of American popular music.

Background
James Thomas Slater was born in Durham, North Carolina.  His father is a psychiatrist who plays the mandolin, and his mother is from Bolivia.  He was raised in the Panama Canal Zone in Central America.

Career

After high school, Slater attended and graduated from the University of Miami School of Music. After a brief move to Los Angeles, he moved again to Zurich, Switzerland where he lived for six years and enjoyed touring, recording, and writing music.  During this time, he wrote "Don't Break My Heart," for Belgian super group Vaya Con Dios, signed a solo contract with BMG Switzerland, and penned the hit "Poco a Poco."

As of 2002, Slater lives in Nashville, Tennessee.  Upon his arrival, he signed with Byron Gallimore's Song Garden/State One publishing company but made the move to EMI Music Publishing.  During his time in Nashville, his songs have been recorded by country superstars like Tim McGraw, Kenny Chesney, Martina McBride, Rodney Atkins, John Michael Montgomery, Lorrie Morgan, Jessica Andrews, and Mark Wills, among others.  McBride's recording of "In My Daughter's Eyes" has become a contemporary standard and garnered Slater a 2006 BMI country award as well as a BMI pop award.  The song was also nominated for a Grammy for best vocal performance.  James recently was nominated for the country song of the year Grammy for Jamey Johnson's "The High Cost of Living". He has also penned Rascal Flatts' single, "Unstoppable" which was used as a theme for the winter Olympics in Vancouver and has written American Idol Kellie Pickler's single, "Falling In Love Again".

James' song "Maggie Creek Road" is featured on Reba McEntire's 2009 album Keep On Loving You which debuted at number 1 on the pop and country charts.  Slater was featured in CMT's in Season 1 of "Gone Country" where he co-wrote the winning song "The Way That I Want You", (which was sung by Julio Iglesias Jr.).

In October 2016, Slater signed with BMG Music Publishing under industry veteran Chris Oglesby joining a roster including Hillary Lindsey, busbee, Tony Lane, and Travis Meadows. Most recently, Slater partnered with Tunecore and released Mexicoma, a selection of songs including the Tim McGraw cut "Mexicoma."

Discography
Slater co-wrote the following singles:
 Keith Urban: "God Whispered Your Name" 
 Old Dominion: "I'll Roll"
 Jessica Andrews: "There's More to Me Than You"
 Gloriana: "Can't Shake You"
 Jamey Johnson: "High Cost Of Living"
 Chris Isaak: "Kiss Me Like A Stranger"
 Martina McBride: "In My Daughter's Eyes"
 Tim McGraw: "Lookin' for That Girl", "Mexicoma", "That's Why God Made Mexico", "Annie I Owe You A Dance", "Open Season On My Heart", "We Carry On""Damn sure Do"
 John Michael Montgomery: "Forever"
 Kellie Pickler: "Makin' Me Fall in Love Again", "100 Proof"
 Rascal Flatts: "Unstoppable", "Life's A Song"
 Chris Young: "I'm Going Your Way Jose"
 Lady Antebellum: "Get To Me"
 Carrie Underwood: "Forever Changed"
 Willie Nelson: "Solo Un Momento"
 Kenny Chesney : "The Life", "Guys Named Captain" "Wasted"
 Reba McEntire: "Maggie Creek Road", "The Clown"
 Emmylou Harris Rodney Crowell: "Open Season On My Heart"
 Enrique Iglesias: "Only A Woman"

References

External links
  Official website
James Slater Interview – NAMM Oral History Library (2016)
James Slater Signs With BMG
 James Slater Mexicoma Spotify

American country songwriters
American male songwriters
American people of Bolivian descent
University of Miami Frost School of Music alumni
Living people
Musicians from Durham, North Carolina
Songwriters from North Carolina
Year of birth missing (living people)